Malá Veleň is a municipality and village in Děčín District in the Ústí nad Labem Region of the Czech Republic. It has about 500 inhabitants.

Administrative parts
Villages of Jedlka and Soutěsky administrative parts of Malá Veleň.

References

Villages in Děčín District